Dragonfly is the tenth album by Masami Okui, released on 2 February 2005. This album is the first album she released under her own record label company Evolution.

Track listing
Dragonfly
Lyrics: Masami Okui
Composition, arrangement: Monta
Fire.com
Lyrics: Masami Okui
Composition, arrangement: Macaroni
Stargate
Lyrics, composition: Masami Okui
Arrangement: Nils
A confession of Tokio
 Commercial song for Iromelo Mix
 Lyrics: Masami Okui
 Composition: Hiroshi Uesugi
 Arrangement: Hideyuki Daichi Suzuki
Route89
Lyrics: Masami Okui
Composition, arrangement: Monta
Wheel
Lyrics, composition: Masami Okui
Arrangement: Kenichi Sudo

 Lyrics: Masami Okui
 Composition, arrangement: Monta
Heaven's Door
Lyrics, composition: Masami Okui
Arrangement: Hideki Sato
Nostalgia
Lyrics:: Masami Okui, Toshiro Yabuki
Composition, arrangement: Toshiro Yabuki

Lyrics: Masami Okui
Composition, arrangement: Macaroni 
To all the things to love
Lyrics, composition: Masami Okui
Arrangement: Hideyuki Daichi Suzuki
Olive
 Commercial song for Iromelo Mix
 Lyrics, composition: Masami Okui
 Arrangement: Hideyuki Daichi Suzuki

Sources
Discography on official website: Makusonia

2005 albums
Masami Okui albums